Deia River may refer to the following rivers in Romania

 Deia River - tributary of the Moldova River
 Deia River - tributary of the Moldovița River

See also 
 Deia, a village in Suceava County, Romania
 Deià, a small coastal village in the Serra de Tramuntana, Mallorca
 Deița River